The Dingle Marathon is a race event that takes place in Dingle, County Kerry, Ireland which consists of a half, a full and an ultra marathon. The event started in 2009. The marathon begins and ends in Dingle town, taking in Slea Head and the Dingle Peninsula on its route, whilst the half marathon goes from Dingle to Dun Chaoin.

References

External links
 Dingle Marathon

Marathons in Europe
Athletics in the Republic of Ireland
Sport in County Kerry